Tecámac is a municipality in State of Mexico in Mexico. The municipality covers an area of  157.34 km². The municipal seat lies in the town (locality) of Tecámac de Felipe Villanueva. Its largest town, Ojo de Agua, with a population of 242,283 inhabitants, is the largest locality in Mexico that is not a municipal seat.

As of the 2010 census, the municipality had a total population of 364,579 inhabitants.

Geography

The town of Tecámac de Villanueva, a municipal seat, has governing jurisdiction over the following communities: Ozumbilla, Santa María Ajoloapan, San Lucas Xolox, Los Reyes Acozac and Ojo de Agua. The total municipality extends 157.34 km and borders with the municipalities of Zumpango, Temascalapa, Tonanitla, Teotihuacán and Ecatepec de Morelos.

Economy
Tecámac Power Center is an important shopping destination for Tecámac and surrounding municipalities,  in area, anchored by Cinépolis cinemas, FunCentral (entertainment area), Home Depot, Sam's Club, Suburbia, and Walmart.

Politics

Demography

The largest localities (cities, towns, and villages) are:

References

 
Populated places in the State of Mexico